The Bangladesh Film Directors Association is the pan-national trade body of film directors in Bangladesh. The association's general secretary is Badiul Alam Khokon. Mushfiqur Rahman Gulzar is the president of the association.

Controversies
On 30 July 2016 the association organized a protest rally outside of Bangladesh National Press Club to protest against the government decision to allow the screening of a number of Hindi movies in local theaters.

In April 2017 the association banned its members from working with Shakib Khan after he made comments in the press criticizing directors.

References

External links 
 Official website -  Bangladesh Film Directors Association

Trade associations based in Bangladesh
Organisations based in Dhaka
Entertainment industry unions
Labour relations in Bangladesh